Around the World in Eighty Days is a 1919 German silent adventure comedy film, directed and produced by Richard Oswald and starring Conrad Veidt, Anita Berber, and Reinhold Schünzel. It is based on the 1873 Jules Verne novel Around the World in Eighty Days. It premiered at the Marmorhaus in Berlin.

Plot
In order to win a bet, British gentleman Phileas Fogg attempts to circle the globe in eighty days, along with his French servant, Passepartout. Fogg is wrongly suspected of having robbed the Bank of England and faces the risk of arrest throughout his journey.

Cast
 Conrad Veidt - Phileas Fogg
 Anita Berber - Aouda
 Reinhold Schünzel - Archibald Corsican
 Eugen Rex - Passepartout
 Max Gülstorff - Detektiv Fix
 Käte Oswald - Nemea
 Paul Morgan - John Forster

Bibliography

External links

1919 films
Films of the Weimar Republic
Films directed by Richard Oswald
Films set in London
Films set in San Francisco
German silent feature films
1919
German black-and-white films
German adventure comedy films
1910s adventure comedy films
1919 comedy films
Cultural depictions of Indian women
Silent adventure comedy films
1910s German films